Territorial Assembly elections were held in Moyen-Congo in 1952. The Congolese Progressive Party emerged as the largest faction, winning 16 seats in the second college.

Electoral system
The 37 members of the Territorial Assembly were elected in two colleges; the first college elected 13 members and the second elected 24.

Results

References

Moyen Congo
1952 in Moyen-Congo
Elections in the Republic of the Congo